Zuk may refer to:

Zuk (surname)
Zuk, Iran, a village in Iran
FSC Żuk, a Polish motor vehicle
ZUK Mobile, a smartphone company owned by Chinese technology company Lenovo

See also
 
Zhuk (disambiguation)